Marco Antonio Montelongo Rosas (born 31 August 1998) is a Mexican footballer who plays as a midfielder for UAT.

References

1998 births
Living people
Association football midfielders
Real Victoria Carmen footballers
Correcaminos UAT footballers
Ascenso MX players
Liga Premier de México players
Tercera División de México players
Footballers from Tabasco
Mexican footballers